Events from the year 1551 in Ireland.

Incumbent
Monarch: Edward VI

Events
 An edition of the Book of Common Prayer printed by Humphrey Powell, de facto King's Printer in Dublin, becomes the first book printed in Ireland.

Deaths
November 7 – Murrough O'Brien, 1st Earl of Thomond, peer.

References

 
1550s in Ireland
Ireland
Years of the 16th century in Ireland